Headquarters Rapid Reaction Corps-France (HQ RRC-FR) created on 1 July 2005, is a corps headquarters of the French Army. It is NATO certified and declared capable of commanding a national or multinational land component of between 5,000 and 60,000 personnel. Plans call for the headquarters to command forces under French, EU or NATO command. It is subordinated to Land Forces Command (CFT).

The corps headquarters is stationed in Lille, within the Citadel of Lille, a 17th-century citadel also known as "the Queen of the Citadels", designed by the famous French fortress designer Sébastien Le Prestre de Vauban.

History 
The headquarters is led by the French Army, and designed to direct a multinational force of up to army corps size. It numbers 450 personnel (including 70 non-French officers and NCOs, from 12 different EU or NATO countries), and up to 750 in times of crisis. The corps HQ is open to all EU and NATO members (18% of its strength). Though stationed in France, its working language is English.
	  	
In 2003, the decision was taken to create a rapid reaction force headquarters. The RRC-FR headquarters began forming on 1 July 2005. The CRR-FR was officially founded on 1 October 2006, in a ceremony including representatives of 22 nations, along with generals Henri Bentégeat and Bernard Thorette, then Chief of Staff of the French Army. Establishing the RRC-FR has been seen as a move to strengthen the emergence of a European defence force.

Following a detailed examination of its capabilities, the Headquarters Rapid Reaction Corps-France was certified as a High Readiness Force (HRF) headquarters by NATO in July 2007.

Once placed on alert, it is able to deploy reconnaissance teams to an operation area within two days, following a political decision to commit troops, and a command post (CP) in less than thirty days.

Flexible 
HQ RRC-FR is able to perform a wide variety of missions, ranging from initial entry to stabilisation operations.
 
It can be committed within a multinational environment, in the framework of NATO, the European Union (EU), or even under a national mandate. 
Thus:
 From 1 July to 31 December 2008, it assumed NATO Response Force (NRF11) Land Component standby period.
 From January to May 2009, part of the HQ staff members contributed to reinforce European Force (EUFOR) in Chad and the Central African Republic.
 From August 2010 to January 2011, about 180 personnel (including about thirty allies) were deployed to Afghanistan, to man part of the positions of International Security Assistance Force corps-level headquarters, the ISAF Joint Command (IJC).
 Until the end of 2014, HQ RRC-FR assumed NATO Response Force (NRF) Land Component standby period.
 In 2015, HQ RRC-FR celebrated its 10th anniversary. 
 In 2015-2016, deployment of a part of the Headquarters as the Joint Command Post of Operation Barkhane in Africa.
 In 2017, NATO Joint Task Force (JTF) certification.
 Summer 2017: beginning of the NATO JTF standby period (one year).

At the same time, French personnel of RRC-FR’s staff are contributing to the Opération Sentinelle as all French army operational units.

Open to the world
With the existence of a multinational corps headquarters, the French Army has a complete range of different sizes of HQ from battalion all the way up to Corps. Its creation allows France to contribute according to its position and international commitments, while remaining consistent with the requirements of national security and defence, within the framework of the EU or NATO.

In a crisis, French and Allied operational reinforcements would augment its strength up to 750 personnel, to enable HQ RRC-FR to conduct long term high-intensity operations.

Fifteen contributing states
In addition to France, the corps framework state, fifteen different states contribute to the staff on a permanent basis, representing a total of 80 personnel.

Everything is done to draw on the military experience of each nation. A constant exchange is facilitated by the use of English as a common working language. 
 NATO and European Union members
  Belgium 
  Denmark 
  France 
  Germany
  Greece
  Hungary
  Italy
  Netherlands
  Romania 
  Spain 
 NATO members
  Albania
  Canada 
  Turkey 
  United Kingdom 
  United States of America

Signals and communications 
The corps headquarters benefits from the best fibre-optic-equipped site among the French Army: about 300 km fibre deployed between and inside its 17th-century walls. There, are 18 (French + NATO) computer and phone networks.

All of them can be projected, via satellite link to an operational theatre providing HQ RRC-FR with the capacity to command, if needed, an operation from its Citadel based Command Post, thanks to a rear Homebase Operation Center (HBOC).

As for now, HQ RRC-FR benefits from the sole French phone exchange directly connected to the NATO network.

A 24 person-team is responsible for assembling, maintenance and operation on these networks, which offers HQ RRC-FR complete autonomy in this domain, compared to other headquarters.

When deployed, HQ RRC-FR can use up to five thousand square metres of tentage, four hundred and fifty modular CP shelters, seventy kilometres of electrical cable, one hundred and twenty kilometres of fibre optics and sixteen hundred computers.

See also
Allied Rapid Reaction Corps

References

External links
Présentation du CRR-Fr sur le site du ministère de la Défense 
 RRC-FR brochure

External links 
 RRC-FR official Facebook Page
 RRC-FR commanding general interview on local channel, Weo

Corps of France
Multinational units and formations
Military units and formations established in 2006
NATO Rapid Deployable Corps